= L V star =

L V star may refer to:

- Brown dwarf
- Red dwarf
